The halo effect is the tendency for positive impressions of a person, company, brand or product in one area to positively influence one's opinion or feelings in other areas.

The Halo Effect or Halo Effect may also refer to:

The Halo Effect (band), a Swedish melodic death metal band
The Halo Effect (book), a book by business academic Phil Rosenzweig
 "Halo Effect", a song by Canadian rock band Rush on the 2012 album Clockwork Angels